Íris Björk Símonardóttir (born 26 June 1987) is an Icelandic former handballer who played 71 games for the Iceland national team. She won the Icelandic championship three times and the Icelandic Handball Cup seven times during her career. She was named the Icelandic Women's Handball Player of the Year in 2015 and 2019.

Awards, titles and accomplishments

Titles 
Icelandic champion: 2015, 2016, 2019
Icelandic Handball Cup: 2010, 2011, 2012, 2013, 2014, 2015, 2019

Individual awards 
Icelandic Women's Handball Player of the Year: 2015, 2019
Úrvalsdeild kvenna Player of the Year: 2019
Úrvalsdeild kvenna Goalkeeper of the Year (5): 2011, 2014, 2015, 2016, 2019

References

1987 births
Living people
Iris Bjork Simonardottir
Expatriate handball players
Iris Bjork Simonardottir
Iris Bjork Simonardottir